William Charles Zopf Jr. (born June 7, 1948) is an American former professional basketball player. He was a point guard and played collegiately at Duquesne University. He played for the Milwaukee Bucks during his brief National Basketball Association (NBA) career.

High school career 
Zopf attended Monaca High School. As a senior, he scored 391 points while leading his team to a 21-1 record.

College career 
Zopf played four seasons at Duquesne University, scoring 999 points and scoring 13.3 points per game. He was named the Steel Bowl Tournament and as a senior was named to the American All Academic Team.

Professional career 
Zopf was selected with the 16th pick, in the second round of the 1970 NBA Draft by the Milwaukee Bucks. He played 53 games for the Bucks in 1970-71, averaging 2.2 points, 0.9 rebounds, and 1.4 assists per game, shooting 36.3% from the field and 55.6% from the free throw line. He left the Bucks in February 1971 due to a call-up to the army reserve unit. After returning for the fall of 1971, the Bucks waived Zopf on October 2, 1971.

Personal life 
After retiring from the NBA, Zopf worked as a business equipment lease broker. Zopf coached his daughter Annie's AAU basketball team. She went on to play collegiately at Fordham University.
Bill Zopf was named to the Beaver County (Pennsylvania) Sports Hall of Fame in 1988.

References

External links
NBA stats at basketballreference.com

1948 births
Living people
American men's basketball players
Basketball players from Pennsylvania
Duquesne Dukes men's basketball players
Milwaukee Bucks draft picks
Milwaukee Bucks players
People from Beaver County, Pennsylvania
Point guards
Sportspeople from the Pittsburgh metropolitan area